The following is a complete list of episodes for SWAT Kats: The Radical Squadron, a television cartoon series created by Christian and Yvon Tremblay. SWAT Kats: The Radical Squadron premiered on TBS Superstation's The Funtastic World of Hanna-Barbera block in the United States on September 11, 1993 and ended on January 6, 1995.

The series consists of a total of 25 original episodes over two seasons, including four "half" episodes ("SWAT Kats Unplugged", "Cry Turmoil", "Volcanus Erupts!" and "The Origin of Dr. Viper" – running around 15 minutes in length) aired during the second season. A "documentary" episode featuring clips from previous episodes aired as a sort of closer once the series was cancelled. This brings the total number of broadcast episodes to 26. There were also three episodes in production at the time of the series' cancellation as well as two that never made it past the concept stage. The first season consists of thirteen episodes; the second season consists of thirteen episodes. Also, the show's distinctive opening and closing theme music changed during production of the second season to a heavier, more metal-influenced theme, as well as the character design becoming more angular.

Every episode of the series was directed by Robert Alvarez. The bulk of the series was written by Glenn Leopold (13 episodes) and Lance Falk (6 episodes). Jim Stenstrum contributed two episodes, while David Ehrman, Von Williams, Eric Clark (with Lance Falk), Mark Saraceni and Jim Katz all contributed one episode. Lance Falk's ideas were usually very ambitious and very inventive and this usually met with the studio executives telling him to change his ideas to something more simple, such as making the Aquians "kat" aliens instead of humans in "The Fall of Jacob Doughty" or to cut out entire characters and subplots, such as making Commander Feral the one Turmoil successfully corrupts in "Cry Turmoil".

The cancellation of the series occurred near the end of season two's production. The reason why is not exactly known, but the show's violence, declining viewership and its inability to move merchandise have been cited as the most likely causes. At the time, Hanna-Barbera was busy on Cartoon Network's ambitious cartoon anthology series What a Cartoon! which may also have contributed to the cancelation.

Series overview

Episodes

Season 1: 1993

Season 2: 1994

Special: 1995

Others

Unfinished episodes 
These three episodes were in various stages of production at the time of the series' cancellation. They have never been aired and none of them were ever completely finished.

 "Succubus!": Also known as "The Curse of Kataluna". Commander Feral falls in love with a woman named Katrina Moorkroft, who is actually a succubus, and she begins to drain his lifeforce away. Elements of this episode were later recycled by writers Glenn Leopold and Davis Doi for a second-season episode, "Eclipse", of The Real Adventures of Jonny Quest, and later still for the direct-to-video movie Scooby-Doo on Zombie Island.
 "Turmoil II: The Revenge": Turmoil escapes from prison, and with the help of the women she liberated from jail, gains control of a laser device from her fortress, on top of a huge mountain. This episode would mark the return of Turmoil from Season 2's fifth episode, "Cry Turmoil".
 "Doctors of Doom": Dr. Harley Street (the alien-mutated scientist from "The Ci-Kat-A") resurfaces and teams up with Dr. Viper in creating havoc in Megakat City. This episode was supposed to tell us about the fate of Dr. Harley Street who was supposedly killed in the first-season episode "The Ci-Kat-A".

Episodes that were never produced 
Four episodes were only in the very early concept stages at the time of the series' cancellation. They did not even enter the production or animation stage.

 "Cold War": According to Lance Falk, one of Hanna Barbera's writers, Rex Shard (who last appeared in "Chaos in Crystal") was supposed to return, now as a weather-controlling mutant warrior looking to freeze Megakat City after diving into an experimental energy source.
 "Blackout": According to Falk, this unused premise would feature a power failure that is just the start of the problems in Megakat City, especially when a new villain called Blackout threatens to destroy the city.
 "The Vampire She-Kat": Dr. Viper tests one of his mutagens on Lt. Felina that turns her into a vampire she kat. But Felina rebels against everyone, including Dr. Viper. But The Swat Kats & Professor Konway are able to get her back to normal.
 "Blowout!": Dark Kat teams up with Dr. Viper and the Metallikats again in a bid to eliminate the SWAT Kats once and for all. Intended as the season one finale, "Blowout!" was written by Lance Falk and never produced, although elements from it were originally used in Glenn Leopold's script for "Katastrophe".

References 

SWAT Kats: The Radical Squadron